Gary Trowell (born 10 April 1959) is an Australian former cyclist. He competed in the individual road race and the team time trial events at the 1984 Summer Olympics.

References

External links
 

1959 births
Living people
Australian male cyclists
Olympic cyclists of Australia
Cyclists at the 1984 Summer Olympics
Cyclists from Melbourne